Amanda Chadderton is a British Labour politician and leader of Oldham Metropolitan Borough Council. Prior to becoming leader, she was the deputy leader and cabinet member with responsibilities for neighbourhoods.

First elected to the council in 2012, she is the councillor for the Royton South ward. Chadderton was elected as  council leader on 25 May 2022, becoming the town's third leader in just over a year after her predecessor Arooj Shah lost her seat in that year's election after just one year in post.

References 

Living people
Labour Party (UK) councillors
Leaders of local authorities of England
Year of birth missing (living people)
Members of the Greater Manchester Combined Authority